The Mobile Arts Council is an umbrella organization for the arts in Mobile, Alabama.  It was founded in 1955 as a project of the Junior League of Mobile with the mission to "increase cooperation among artistic and cultural organizations in the area and to provide a forum for problems in art, music, theater, and literature."  A full-time, paid director was hired in 1958. Among its many activities, it hosts the exhibition of the works of artists and provides funding for arts education.

References

External links
 Mobile Arts Council Website

Cultural institutions in Mobile, Alabama